is the Latin term for "trousers", and in this context is today used to refer to a style of trousers made from wool. According to the Romans, this style of clothing originated from the Gauls.

 were typically made with a drawstring, and tended to reach from just above the knee at the shortest, to the ankles at the longest, with length generally increasing in tribes living further north.

For the Romans, to encircle the legs and thighs with fasciae, or bands, was understood, in the time of Pompey and Horace, to be a proof of ill health and effeminacy. Roman men typically wore tunics, which were one-piece outfits terminating at or above the knee.

Etymology
The word originates from the Gaulish , after going through a process of syncopation it gave rise to  "trouser, pants".

The word is cognate with the English breeches. Transition through Etruscan accounts for the Greek  being rendered as Latin , Greek  as Latin .

Bibliography 
Collis, John (2003). The Celts: Origins, Myths, Inventions, Tempus. 
Wells, Peter S (2001). Beyond Celts, Germans and Scythians, Duckworth Debates in Archaeology. 
Oppenheimer, Stephen (2006). The Origins of the British, Constable & Robinson.
 Hazel Dodge, Peter Connolly: Die antike Stadt. Ein Leben in Athen und Rom. . Kapitel Kleidung.
 August Mau: Ἀναξυρίδες. In: Paulys Realencyclopädie der classischen Altertumswissenschaft (RE). Band I, 2, Stuttgart 1893ff., Sp. 2100 f.
 James Yates: Bracae. In: William Smith: A Dictionary of Greek and Roman Antiquities. John Murray, London 1875, S. 213 (online)

References

Celtic culture
Trousers and shorts